Catumaxomab (trade name Removab) is a rat-mouse hybrid monoclonal antibody which is used to treat malignant ascites, a condition occurring in people with metastasizing cancer. It binds to antigens CD3 and EpCAM. It was developed by Fresenius Biotech and Trion Pharma (Germany).

Medical use
The drug is used for the treatment of malignant ascites in people with EpCAM-positive cancer if a standard therapy is not available. Ascites is an accumulation of fluid in the peritoneal cavity.

The usual treatment of malignant ascites is to puncture the peritoneum to let the accumulated fluid drain out. After the puncture, catumaxomab is given as an intraperitoneal infusion. The procedure is repeated four times within about eleven days. It has been shown that puncture free survival can be increased from 11 to 46 days with this treatment.

Adverse effects
Common adverse effects include fever, nausea and vomiting. Fever and pain should be controlled by giving NSAIDs, analgetics or antipyretics before application of catumaxomab. All side effects were fully reversible in studies. Most are caused by the liberation of cytokines.

Mechanism of action

Many types of cancer cells carry EpCAM (epithelial cell adhesion molecule) on their surface. By binding to such a cell via one arm, to a T lymphocyte via the other arm and to an antigen-presenting cell like a macrophage, a natural killer cell or a dendritic cell via the heavy chains, an immunological reaction against the cancer cell is triggered. Removing cancer cells from the abdominal cavity reduces the tumour burden which is seen as the cause for ascites in people with cancer.

Chemical structure
Catumaxomab consists of one "half" (one heavy chain and one light chain) of an anti-EpCAM antibody and one half of an anti-CD3 antibody, so that each molecule of catumaxomab can bind both EpCAM and CD3. In addition, the Fc-region can bind to an Fc receptor  on accessory cells like other antibodies, which has led to calling the drug a trifunctional antibody.

History
Catumaxomab was developed by Trion Pharma, based on preliminary work by the Helmholtz Zentrum München. Dr. Horst Lindhofer is listed at the primary inventor of the patent. Fresenius Biotech conducted clinical trials and filed the drug for approval with the European Medicines Agency (EMA). It was approved in Europe on 20 April 2009. In 2013, catumaxomab was voluntarily withdrawn from the US market and in 2017 in the EU market for commercial reasons. The product had not been marketed in the EU since 2014.

References

External links 
 The trifunctional antibody catumaxomab: information for healthcare professionals (manufacturer website)

Monoclonal antibodies for tumors
Experimental drugs